

Deorlaf (died  886) was a medieval Bishop of Hereford. He was consecrated between 857 and 866 and died between 884 and 888.

Citations

References

External links
 

Bishops of Hereford
9th-century English bishops
880s deaths
Year of birth unknown